Mimachlamys gloriosa is a bivalve in the family Pectinidae.

References

Pectinidae